The 2022 NHRA SpringNationals were a National Hot Rod Association (NHRA) drag racing event, held at Houston Raceway Park in Baytown, Texas on April 24, 2022. Brittany Force took the victory in Top Fuel, while Matt Hagan won in Funny Car, and Erica Enders won in Pro Stock.

Results

Top Fuel

Funny Car

Pro Stock 

 McGaha had the faster time, but had a red-light start

Notes 

NHRA SpringNationals

SpringNationals